is a Japanese stuntwoman and suit actress (an actress in a full-body rubber suit). She was formerly associated with Japan Enterprise Action.

Biography
In 1998, she became the first woman to complete Stage 1 of Sasuke (known as Ninja Warrior franchise globally), during the 2nd Competition. She could not, however, complete the Spider Walk in Stage 2, as she was not tall enough to properly negotiate the obstacle. This accomplishment would not be matched until the 34th Competition, when Jessie Graff (another stuntwoman and frequent competitor of its United States version) surpassed the accomplishment by reaching Stage 3. Tanabe also competed in Kunoichi, the women's version of Sasuke, but failed in Stage 3 after a misstep. She initially did not plan to compete again due to her plans of having a baby, but she later competed in the 4th Competition, where she failed Stage 1's Hop Rocket, and in the 5th Competition, where she failed the first stage angle run, and in the 6th competition, where she failed on the barrel roll. On the 7th competition, she ran out of time because of losing time on the spinning log. And on the 8th competition, she failed on the first stage swing jump.

Filmography

Actress
Metropolitan Police Branch 82
Ninja Sentai Kakuranger
Kyuukyuu Sentai GoGo-V
Gamble Queen

Suit actor
Chikyuu Sentai Fiveman as Arthur G6
Chōriki Sentai Ohranger as Tackle Boy
Gekisou Sentai Carranger as Hazardian Dappu
Tokusou Robo Janperson as Kyaoru (Carol)
B-Robo Kabutack as Kabutack
Hyper Doll as Mica Minazuki

Stunts
Kyōryū Sentai Zyuranger
Ie Naki Ko
Marutai no Onna
Sakuya Yokai-Den

Voice
 Clock Tower 3 as Rooder's Ghost

References

External links

1971 births
Living people
Japanese actresses
Sasuke (TV series) contestants
Japanese stunt performers
Place of birth missing (living people)